Panellinios Limassol  was a Cypriot football team who played in the Cypriot Second Division. 

In 1961-62 and 1962-1963 the team won the Cypriot Second Division but the club didn't participate in the Cypriot First Division because they lost at relegation play-offs from first division teams.

Achievements
Cypriot Second Division: 1961-62, 1962-63

References

External links
 Cypriot Second Division Winners
 Cypriot Second Division#Performance By Club
Defunct football clubs in Cyprus